"We Never Give Up!" is a single by Japanese boy band Kis-My-Ft2. It was released on December 14, 2011. It debuted in number one on the weekly Oricon Singles Chart and reached number one on the Billboard Japan Hot 100. It was the 18th best-selling single in Japan in 2012, with 321,573 copies.

References 

2011 singles
2011 songs
Japanese-language songs
Kis-My-Ft2 songs
Oricon Weekly number-one singles
Billboard Japan Hot 100 number-one singles
Song articles with missing songwriters